Palazzo Parisio may refer to:
Palazzo Parisio (Valletta)
Palazzo Parisio (Naxxar)

See also
Villa Parisio